Port Fairy was an electoral district of the Legislative Assembly in the Australian state of Victoria from 1889 to 1927. 
It was created when the Electoral district of Belfast was renamed. Bryan O'Loghlen was the last member for Belfast, serving 1888–1889.

It centred on the coastal town of Port Fairy in western Victoria. It was replaced in 1927 by the Electoral district of Port Fairy and Glenelg.

In 2002, Port Fairy was incorporated into the South-West Coast electorate.  Denis Napthine has been the sitting member since 2002.

Members for Port Fairy

Election results

References

Former electoral districts of Victoria (Australia)
1889 establishments in Australia
1927 disestablishments in Australia